This is a list of the major honours won by football clubs in Senegal. It lists every Senegalese association football club to have won any of the major domestic trophies, the Senegalese League, the Senegalese Cup, the Senegalese Super Cup (then the National Assembly (Assemblée Nationale) Cup), the Senegalese League Cup and the Senegalese Champion's Trophy, or the international competition the UFOA Cup, since Senegalese clubs have not won any major official African competition yet.

Honours table

Notes

External links
Rec.Sport.Soccer Statistics Foundation

Senegal by major honours won
Football clubs in Senegal
Football clubs